The Acrocephalidae (the reed warblers, marsh- and tree-warblers, or acrocephalid warblers) are a family of oscine passerine birds, in the superfamily Sylvioidea.

The species in this family are usually rather large "warblers". Most are rather plain olivaceous brown above with much yellow to beige below. They are usually found in open woodland, reedbeds, or tall grass. The family occurs mostly in southern to western Eurasia and surroundings, but also ranges far into the Pacific, with some species in Africa.

Genus Acrocephalus
Marsh-warblers. About 42 species; para- or polyphyletic.

 Moustached warbler, Acrocephalus melanopogon
 Aquatic warbler, Acrocephalus paludicola
 Sedge warbler, Acrocephalus schoenobaenus
 Speckled reed warbler, Acrocephalus sorghophilus
 Black-browed reed warbler, Acrocephalus bistrigiceps
 Paddyfield warbler, Acrocephalus agricola
 Manchurian reed warbler, Acrocephalus tangorum
 Blunt-winged warbler, Acrocephalus concinens
 Common reed warbler, Acrocephalus scirpaceus
 Caspian reed warbler, Acrocephalus (scirpaceus) fuscus
 Mangrove reed warbler, Acrocephalus (scirpaceus) avicenniae
 Blyth's reed warbler, Acrocephalus dumetorum
 Marsh warbler, Acrocephalus palustris
 Great reed warbler, Acrocephalus arundinaceus
 Oriental reed warbler, Acrocephalus orientalis
 Clamorous reed warbler, Acrocephalus stentoreus
 Large-billed reed warbler, Acrocephalus orinus
 Basra reed warbler, Acrocephalus griseldis
 Australian reed warbler, Acrocephalus australis
 ✝Nightingale reed warbler, Acrocephalus luscinius
 Saipan reed warbler, Acrocephalus hiwae
 ✝Aguiguan reed warbler, Acrocephalus nijoi – extinct (c.1997)
 ✝Mangareva reed warbler, Acrocephalus astrolabii – extinct (mid-19th century?)
 ✝Pagan reed warbler, Acrocephalus yamashinae extinct (1970s)
 Caroline reed warbler, Acrocephalus syrinx
 Nauru reed warbler, Acrocephalus rehsei
 Millerbird, Acrocephalus familiaris
 ✝Laysan millerbird, Acrocephalus familiaris familiaris – extinct (late 1910s)
 Bokikokiko, Acrocephalus aequinoctialis
 Tahiti reed warbler, Acrocephalus caffer
 Moorea reed warbler, Acrocephalus longirostris
 ✝Garrett's reed warbler, Acrocephalus garretti – extinct (19th century?)
 ✝Raiatea reed warbler, Acrocephalus caffer musae – extinct (19th century?)
 Tuamotu reed warbler, Acrocephalus atyphus
 Rimatara reed warbler, Acrocephalus rimatarae
 Pitcairn reed warbler, Acrocephalus vaughani
 Henderson reed warbler, Acrocephalus taiti
 Northern Marquesan reed warbler, Acrocephalus percernis
 Southern Marquesan reed warbler, Acrocephalus mendanae
 Cook reed warbler, Acrocephalus kerearako
 Greater swamp warbler, Acrocephalus rufescens
 Cape Verde warbler, Acrocephalus brevipennis
 Lesser swamp warbler, Acrocephalus gracilirostris
 Madagascar swamp warbler, Acrocephalus newtoni
 Rodrigues warbler, Acrocephalus rodericanus
 Seychelles warbler, Acrocephalus sechellensis

Genus Arundinax
 Thick-billed warbler, Arundinax aedon

Genus Iduna
 Booted warbler, Iduna caligata
 Sykes's warbler, Iduna rama
 Eastern olivaceous warbler, Iduna pallida
 Western olivaceous warbler, Iduna opaca
 African yellow warbler, Iduna natalensis
 Mountain yellow warbler, Iduna similis

Genus Hippolais
 Upcher's warbler, Hippolais languida
 Olive-tree warbler, Hippolais olivetorum
 Melodious warbler, Hippolais polyglotta
 Icterine warbler, Hippolais icterina

Genus Calamonastides
 Papyrus yellow warbler, Calamonastides gracilirostris

Genus Graueria
 Grauer's warbler, Graueria vittata

Genus Nesillas
Brush warblers. 5 living species, 1 recently extinct.
 Aldabra brush warbler, Nesillas aldabrana (extinct: c.1984)
 Anjouan brush warbler, Nesillas longicaudata
 Malagasy brush warbler, Nesillas typica
 Grand Comoro brush warbler, Nesillas brevicaudata
 Moheli brush warbler, Nesillas mariae
 Subdesert brush warbler, Nesillas lantzii

References
 del Hoyo, J.; Elliot, A. & Christie D. (editors). (2006). Handbook of the Birds of the World Volume 11: Old World Flycatchers to Old World Warblers. Lynx Edicions. .

 
Bird families
Taxa named by Osbert Salvin